Cédric Zesiger (born 24 June 1998) is a Swiss professional footballer who plays as a centre-back for Swiss Super League club Young Boys and the Switzerland national team.

Club career
On 29 June 2019, it was confirmed that Zesiger had signed a four-year contract with Young Boys.

International career
He made his debut for the Switzerland national football team on 1 September 2021 in a friendly against Greece. He played the full match in a 2–1 home victory.

Career statistics

Club

References

External links 
 Swiss U20 Profile
 Swiss U21 Profile
 

1998 births
Living people
Sportspeople from the canton of Fribourg
Swiss men's footballers
Association football defenders
Switzerland youth international footballers
Switzerland under-21 international footballers
Switzerland international footballers
Swiss Super League players
Neuchâtel Xamax FCS players
Grasshopper Club Zürich players
BSC Young Boys players